Guido Frederico João Pabst (born 19 September 1914 in Porto Alegre, died 27 April 1980 in Rio de Janeiro) was a Brazilian botanist. With his friend Edmundo Pereira, he founded the Herbarium Bradeanum in Rio de Janeiro.

Works

References

20th-century Brazilian botanists
1914 births
1980 deaths